Dietland is an American dark comedy drama television series created by Marti Noxon, based on the 2015 novel of the same name by Sarai Walker. The straight-to-series 10-episode first season premiered on AMC with back to back episodes on June 4, 2018.

On September 20, 2018, AMC announced that the series had been cancelled. The series had persistently low ratings. The show averaged a mere 203,000 viewers among the advertiser-coveted adults 18-48 demographics — with three days of DVR.

Cast and characters

Main
Joy Nash as Alicia "Plum" Kettle
Tamara Tunie as Julia Smith
Robin Weigert as Verena Baptist
Rowena King as Cheryl Crane-Murphy
Adam Rothenberg as Dominic O'Shea
Erin Darke as Leeta Albridge
Ricardo Davila as Eladio
Tramell Tillman as Steven
Will Seefried as Ben
Julianna Margulies as Kitty Montgomery

Recurring
 Melissa Navia as Moana
Debra Monk as Mrs Kettle
Dariush Kashani as Clive
Alanna Ubach as Marlowe Buchanan
Ami Sheth as Sana
Campbell Scott as Stanley Austen
Jen Ponton as Rubi
Kelly Hu as Abra Austen
Marc Blucas as Bobby
Mark Tallman as Jake
Mya Taylor as Barbara
Colby Minifie as Jasmine
Laura Darrell as Anna
Karen Eilbacher as Jillian

Episodes

Reception

Critical response
On the review aggregator website Rotten Tomatoes, the series has an approval rating of 83% based on 52 reviews, with an average rating of 6.8/10. The website's critical consensus reads, "The well-acted Dietland delivers timely and engaging social commentary with enough humor and scathing wit to make up for an occasionally scattered narrative approach." Metacritic, which uses a weighted average, assigned a score of 66 out of 100 based on 22 critics, indicating "generally favorable reviews".

Ratings

References

External links
 

2010s American black comedy television series
2010s American comedy-drama television series
2018 American television series debuts
2018 American television series endings
English-language television shows
AMC (TV channel) original programming
Television shows based on American novels
Television shows set in New York City
Obesity in television
Fat acceptance movement
Television series by Skydance Television
Television series by Uncharted
Television series created by Marti Noxon